Man Udhan Varyache is an Indian Marathi language television series which aired on Star Pravah. It is an official remake of Bengali series Bou Kotha Kao which was aired on Star Jalsha.

Summary
Gauri sacrifices her love for Nikhil. She steps out of his life when she finds out about his love for Neeraja, but fate has other plans for her. Nikhil has lost his wife, Neeraja. His daughter, Asmee who is now seven and motherless finds out about Gauri and wants to bring her back as her mother. In the meantime Gauri has agreed to marry Raj, who loves her dearly. However, deep within, she still loves Nikhil. On the other hand, Nikhil's mother presses him to marry Aditi, but he still longs for Gauri. They come face to face by a twist of destiny and misunderstandings rise.

Cast

References

Marathi-language television shows
Star Pravah original programming
2009 Indian television series debuts
2011 Indian television series endings